Archiminolia regalis is a species of sea snail, a marine gastropod mollusk in the family Solariellidae.

Description
The diameter of the shell attains 10.3 mm.

Distribution
This marine species is endemic to New Zealand and occurs Three Kings Islands at depths between 206 m and 221 m.

References

 Marshall B.A. (1999). A revision of the Recent Solariellinae (Gastropoda: Trochoidea) of the New Zealand region. The Nautilus 113(1): 4-42

External links

regalis
Gastropods of New Zealand
Gastropods described in 1999